Congenital syphilis is syphilis present in utero and at birth, and occurs when a child is born to a mother with syphilis. Untreated early syphilis infections results in a high risk of poor pregnancy outcomes, including saddle nose, lower extremity abnormalities, miscarriages, premature births, stillbirths, or death in newborns. Some infants with congenital syphilis have symptoms at birth, but many develop symptoms later. Symptoms may include rash, fever, an enlarged liver and spleen, and skeletal abnormalities. Newborns will typically not develop a primary syphilitic chancre but may present with signs of secondary syphilis (i.e. generalized body rash). Often these babies will develop syphilitic rhinitis ("snuffles"), the mucus from which is laden with the T. pallidum bacterium, and therefore highly infectious. If a baby with congenital syphilis is not treated early, damage to the bones, teeth, eyes, ears, and brain can occur.

Classification

Early

This is a subset of cases of congenital syphilis. Newborns may be asymptomatic and are only identified on routine prenatal screening. If not identified and treated, these newborns develop poor feeding and runny nose. By definition, early congenital syphilis occurs in children between 0 and 2 years old.

Late

Late congenital syphilis is a subset of cases of congenital syphilis. By definition, it occurs in children at or greater than 2 years of age who acquired the infection trans-placentally.

Symptoms include:
 Blunted upper incisor teeth known as Hutchinson's teeth
 Deafness from auditory nerve disease
 Frontal bossing (prominence of the brow ridge)
 Hard palate defect
 Inflammation of the cornea known as interstitial keratitis
 Protruding mandible
 Saber shins
 Saddle nose (collapse of the bony part of nose)
 Short maxillae
 Swollen knees

A frequently-found group of symptoms is Hutchinson's triad, which consists of Hutchinson's teeth (notched incisors), keratitis and deafness and occurs in 63% of cases.

Treatment (with penicillin) before the development of late symptoms is essential.

Signs and symptoms

 Abnormal x-rays
 Anemia
 Cerebral palsy
 Du Bois sign, narrowing of the little finger
 Enlarged liver
 Enlarged spleen
 Frontal bossing
 Sensorineural hearing loss
 Higouménakis' sign, enlargement of the sternal end of clavicle in late congenital syphilis
 Hutchinson's triad, a set of symptoms consisting of deafness, Hutchinson's teeth (centrally notched, widely spaced peg-shaped upper central incisors), and interstitial keratitis (IK), an inflammation of the cornea which can lead to corneal scarring and potential blindness
 Hydrocephalus
 Jaundice
 Lymph node enlargement
 Mulberry molars (permanent first molars with multiple poorly developed cusps)
 Musculoskeletal deformities
 Petechiae
 Poorly developed maxillae
 Pseudoparalysis
 Rhagades, linear scars at the angles of the mouth and nose result from bacterial infection of skin lesions
 Snuffles, aka "syphilitic rhinitis", which appears similar to the rhinitis of the common cold, except it is more severe, lasts longer, often involves bloody rhinorrhea, and is often associated with laryngitis
 Sabre shins
 Skin rash

Death from congenital syphilis is usually due to bleeding into the lungs.

Diagnosis

Serological testing is carried out on the mother and the infant. If the neonatal IgG antibody titres are significantly higher than the mother's, then congenital syphilis can be confirmed. Specific IgM in the infant is another method of confirmation.
CSF pleocytosis, raised CSF protein level and positive CSF serology suggest neurosyphilis.

Treatment

If a pregnant mother is identified as being infected with syphilis, treatment can effectively prevent congenital syphilis from developing in the fetus, especially if she is treated before the sixteenth week of pregnancy. The fetus is at greatest risk of contracting syphilis when the mother is in the early stages of infection, but the disease can be passed at any point during pregnancy, even during delivery (if the child had not already contracted it). A woman in the secondary stage of syphilis decreases her fetus's risk of developing congenital syphilis by 98% if she receives treatment before the last month of pregnancy. An affected child can be treated using antibiotics much like an adult; however, any developmental symptoms are likely to be permanent.

Kassowitz's law is an empirical observation used in context of congenital syphilis stating that the greater the duration between the infection of the mother and conception, the better the outcome for the infant. Features of a better outcome include less chance of stillbirth and of developing congenital syphilis.

The Centers for Disease Control and Prevention recommends treating symptomatic or babies born to an infected mother with unknown treatment status with procaine penicillin G, 50,000 U/kg dose IM a day in a single dose for 10 days. Treatment for these babies can vary on a case-by-case basis. Treatment cannot reverse any deformities, brain, or permanent tissue damage that has already occurred.

A Cochrane review found that antibiotics may be effective for serological cure but in general the evidence around the effectiveness of antibiotics for congenital syphilis is uncertain due to the poor methodological quality of the small number of trials that have been conducted.

Epidemiology
Cases in the United States have been increasingly rising in the 2010s. The Centers for Disease Control and Prevention (CDC) reported 918 cases for 2017, what is more than twice the figures of four years earlier. Reports in 2023 show a rise of more than 900 percent in Mississippi over five years.

References

External links 

 Images of Congenital Syphilis Manifestations
 

Infections with a predominantly sexual mode of transmission
Infections specific to the perinatal period
Syphilis
Disorders causing seizures